Dorcadion is a genus of longhorn beetles of the subfamily Lamiinae.
 
This genus of beetle is found distributed across Europe, most living in either Czech Republic, Slovenia and Hungary. 
This genus also has significant populations in Ukraine, and additional populations live in Russia, Kazakhstan and China.

subgenus Acutodorcadion 
 Dorcadion absinthium Plavilstshikov, 1937
 Dorcadion acutispinum Motschulsky, 1860
 Dorcadion alexandris Pic, 1900
 Dorcadion arietinum Jakovlev, 1897
 Dorcadion danilevskyi Dolin & Ovtschinikov, 1999
 Dorcadion darjae Danilevsky, 2001
 Dorcadion globithorax Jakovlev, 1895
 Dorcadion grande Jakovlev, 1906
 Dorcadion irinae Danilevsky, 1997
 Dorcadion kapchagaicus Danilevsky, 1996
 Dorcadion kastekus Danilevsky, 1996
 Dorcadion leopardinum Plavilstshikov, 1937
 Dorcadion mystacinum Ballion, 1878
 Dorcadion nikolaevi Danilevsky, 1995
 Dorcadion ninae Danilevsky, 1995
 Dorcadion nivosum Suvorov, 1913
 Dorcadion optatum Jakovlev, 1906
 Dorcadion pantherinum Jakovlev, 1900
 Dorcadion pelidnum Jakovlev, 1906
 Dorcadion phenax Jakovlev, 1899
 Dorcadion profanifuga Plavilstshikov, 1951
 Dorcadion songaricum Ganglbauer, 1883
 Dorcadion suvorovi Jakovlev, 1906
 Dorcadion suvorovianum Plavilstshikov, 1916
 Dorcadion tianshanskii Suvorov, 1910
 Dorcadion tibiale Jakovlev, 1890
 Dorcadion toropovi Danilevsky, 1999
 Dorcadion tschitscherini Jakovlev, 1900
 Dorcadion unidiscale Danilevsky, 1996
 Dorcadion urdzharicum Plavilstshikov, 1937

subgenus Carinatodorcadion 
 Dorcadion aethiops (Scopoli, 1763)
 Dorcadion balthasari Heyrovsky, 1962
 Dorcadion carinatum (Pallas, 1771)
 Dorcadion cervae Frivaldszky, 1892
 Dorcadion fulvum (Scopoli, 1763)
 Dorcadion hybridum Ganglbauer, 1883
 Dorcadion ingeae Peks, 1993
 Dorcadion klavdiae Danilevsky, 1992
 Dorcadion laevepunctatum Breuning, 1944
 Dorcadion maderi Breit, 1923
 Dorcadion sterbai Breuning, 1944

subgenus Cribridorcadion 

 Dorcadion abstersum Holzschuh, 1982
 Dorcadion accola Heyden, 1894
 Dorcadion afflictum Pesarini & Sabbadini, 1998
 Dorcadion akpinarense Bernhauer & Peks, 2010
 Dorcadion albanicum Heyrovsky, 1934
 Dorcadion albolineatum Küster, 1847
 Dorcadion albonotatum Pic, 1895
 Dorcadion amanense Breuning, 1943
 Dorcadion anatolicum Pic, 1900
 Dorcadion angorense Ganglbauer, 1897
 Dorcadion apicerufum Breuning, 1943
 Dorcadion arcivagum (Thomson, 1867)
 Dorcadion ardahense Breuning, 1975
 Dorcadion arenarioides Rabaron, 1979
 Dorcadion arenarium (Scopoli, 1763)
 Dorcadion ariannae Pesarini & Sabbadini, 2008
 Dorcadion auratum Tournier, 1872
 Dorcadion axillare Küster, 1847
 Dorcadion bangi Heyden, 1894
 Dorcadion banjkovskyi Plavilstshikov, 1958
 Dorcadion beckeri Kraatz, 1873  
 Dorcadion bernhauerorum Peks, 2010
 Dorcadion berytense Breuning, 1964
 Dorcadion biforme Kraatz, 1873
 Dorcadion bisignatum Jakovlev, 1899
 Dorcadion bistriatum Pic, 1898 
 Dorcadion bithyniense Chevrolat, 1856
 Dorcadion blanchardi Mulsant & Rey, 1863
 Dorcadion blandulus Holzschuh, 1977
 Dorcadion bodemeyeri K. Daniel, 1901
 Dorcadion boluense Breuning, 1962
 Dorcadion borisi Heyrovsky, 1931
 Dorcadion boszdaghense Fairmaire, 1866
 Dorcadion boucardi Pic, 1942
 Dorcadion bouilloni Breuning & Ruspoli, 1975
 Dorcadion brauni Breuning, 1979
 Dorcadion bremeri Breuning, 1981
 Dorcadion brenskei Ganglbauer, 1883
 Dorcadion brunneicolle Kraatz, 1873
 Dorcadion brunoi Breuning, 1964
 Dorcadion bulgharmaadense Breuning, 1946
 Dorcadion buresi Štěrba, 1922
 Dorcadion cachinno Thomson, 1868
 Dorcadion caprai Breuning, 1951
 Dorcadion carinipenne Pic, 1900
 Dorcadion carolisturanii Breuning, 1971
 Dorcadion caspiense Breuning, 1956
 Dorcadion chopardi Breuning, 1948
 Dorcadion chrysochroum Breuning, 1943
 Dorcadion cinctellum Fairmaire, 1866
 Dorcadion cinerarium (Fabricius, 1787)
 Dorcadion cineriferum Suvorov, 1909
 Dorcadion cingulatoides Breuning, 1946
 Dorcadion cingulatum Ganglbauer, 1884
 Dorcadion ciscaucasicum Jakovlev, 1899
 Dorcadion coiffaiti Breuning, 1962
 Dorcadion complanatum Ganglbauer, 1884
 Dorcadion condensatum Küster, 1852
 Dorcadion confluens Fairmaire, 1866
 Dorcadion corcyricum Ganglbauer, 1883
 Dorcadion crassicolle Pesarini & Sabbadini, 2007
 Dorcadion culminicola Thomson, 1868
 Dorcadion czegodaevi Danilevsky, 1992
 Dorcadion czipkai Breuning, 1973
 Dorcadion danczenkoi Danilevsky, 1996
 Dorcadion daratshitshagi Suvorov, 1915
 Dorcadion decipiens Germar, 1824
 Dorcadion demokidovi Suvorov, 1915
 Dorcadion deyrollei Ganglbauer, 1883
 Dorcadion dimidiatum Motschulsky, 1838
 Dorcadion discodivisum Pic, 1939
 Dorcadion discomaculatum Pic, 1905  
 Dorcadion divisum Germar, 1839 
 Dorcadion dokhtouroffi Ganglbauer, 1886
 Dorcadion drusoides Breuning, 1962
 Dorcadion drusum Chevrolat, 1870
 Dorcadion elazigi Breuning, 1971
 Dorcadion elbursense Breuning, 1943
 Dorcadion elegans Kraatz, 1873
 Dorcadion enricisturanii Breuning & Ruspoli, 1971
 Dorcadion equestre (Laxmann, 1770)
 Dorcadion etruscum (Rossi, 1790)
 Dorcadion eugeniae Ganglbauer, 1885
 Dorcadion faldermanni Ganglbauer, 1884
 Dorcadion ferruginipes Ménétries, 1836
 Dorcadion formosum Kraatz, 1870
 Dorcadion frustrator Plavilstshikov, 1958
 Dorcadion funestum Ganglbauer, 1883
 Dorcadion gallipolitanum Thomson, 1876
 Dorcadion gashtarovi Sama, Dascalu & Pesarini, 2010
 Dorcadion gebzeense Breuning, 1974
 Dorcadion glabricolle Breuning, 1943
 Dorcadion glaucum Faldermann, 1837
 Dorcadion gorbunovi Danilevsky, 1985
 Dorcadion granigerum Ganglbauer, 1883
 Dorcadion haemorrhoidale Hampe, 1852
 Dorcadion halepense Kraatz, 1873
 Dorcadion hampii Mulsant & Rey, 1863
 Dorcadion heinzi Breuning, 1964
 Dorcadion heldreichii Kraatz, 1873
 Dorcadion hellmanni Ganglbauer, 1884
 Dorcadion heyrovskyi Breuning, 1943
 Dorcadion holosericeum Krynicky, 1832
 Dorcadion holtzi Pic, 1905
 Dorcadion holzschuhi Breuning, 1974
 Dorcadion hypocritellum Breuning, 1958
 Dorcadion iconiense K. Daniel, 1901
 Dorcadion impressicolle Kraatz, 1873
 Dorcadion indutum Faldermann, 1837
 Dorcadion infernale Mulsant & Rey, 1863
 Dorcadion inikliense Bernhauer & Peks, 2010
 Dorcadion inspersum Holzschuh, 1982
 Dorcadion insulare Kraatz, 1883
 Dorcadion investitum Breuning, 1970
 Dorcadion irakense Al-Ali & Ismail, 1987
 Dorcadion iranicum Breuning, 1947
 Dorcadion ispartense Breuning, 1962
 Dorcadion jacobsoni Jakovlev, 1899
 Dorcadion jakovleviellum Plavilstshikov, 1951
 Dorcadion janatai Kadlec, 2006
 Dorcadion johannisfranci Pesarini & Sabbadini, 2007
 Dorcadion kaimakcalanum Jurecek, 1929
 Dorcadion kalashiani Danilevsky, 1996
 Dorcadion karsense Suvorov, 1916
 Dorcadion kasikoporanum Pic, 1902
 Dorcadion kazanciense Bernhauer & Peks, 2010
 Dorcadion kharpuensis Danilevsky, 1998
 Dorcadion kindermanni Waltl, 1838
 Dorcadion kollari Kraatz, 1873
 Dorcadion komarowi Jakovlev, 1887
 Dorcadion kozanii Breuning, 1962
 Dorcadion kraetschmeri Bernhauer, 1988
 Dorcadion krueperi Ganglbauer, 1883
 Dorcadion kuldschanum Pic, 1908
 Dorcadion kurdistanum Breuning, 1944
 Dorcadion kurucanum Holzschuh, 2007
 Dorcadion kykladicum Breuning, 1944
 Dorcadion ladikanum Braun, 1976
 Dorcadion laeve Faldermann, 1837
 Dorcadion lameeri Théry, 1896
 Dorcadion lamiae Breuning, 1962
 Dorcadion ledouxi Breuning, 1974
 Dorcadion lineatocolle Kraatz, 1873
 Dorcadion lineatopunctatum Breuning, 1944
 Dorcadion litigiosum Ganglbauer, 1884
 Dorcadion ljubetense Pic, 1909
 Dorcadion lodosi Sabbadini & Pesarini, 1992
 Dorcadion longulum Breuning, 1943
 Dorcadion lohsei Braun, 1976
 Dorcadion lugubre Kraatz, 1873
 Dorcadion macedonicum Jurecek, 1929
 Dorcadion maceki Holzschuh, 1995
 Dorcadion maljushenkoi Pic, 1904
 Dorcadion maradense Holzschuh, 2007
 Dorcadion martini Bernhauer, 1988
 Dorcadion mediterraneum Breuning, 1942
 Dorcadion megriense Lazarev, 2009
 Dorcadion menradi Holzschuh, 1989
 Dorcadion merkli Ganglbauer, 1884
 Dorcadion meschniggi Breit, 1928
 Dorcadion mesopotamicum Breuning, 1944
 Dorcadion micans Thomson, 1867
 Dorcadion minkovae Heyrovsky, 1962
 Dorcadion minutum Kraatz, 1873
 Dorcadion mniszechi Kraatz, 1873
 Dorcadion moreanum Pic, 1907
 Dorcadion morozovi Danilevsky, 1992

 Dorcadion multimaculatum Pic, 1932
 Dorcadion murrayi Küster, 1847
 Dorcadion narlianum Özdikmen, Mercan & Cihan, 2012
 Dorcadion nigrostriatum Adlbauer, 1982
 Dorcadion nitidum Motschulsky, 1838
 Dorcadion niveisparsum Thomson, 1865
 Dorcadion nobile Hampe, 1852
 Dorcadion nurense Danilevsky & Murzin, 2009
 Dorcadion obenbergeri Heyrovsky, 1940
 Dorcadion obtusum Breuning, 1944
 Dorcadion oetalicum Pic, 1902
 Dorcadion oezdurali Önalp, 1988
 Dorcadion olympicum Kraatz, 1873
 Dorcadion ortrudae Braun, 1978
 Dorcadion ossae Heyrovsky, 1941
 Dorcadion pararenarium Breuning, 1969
 Dorcadion pararufipenne Braun, 1976
 Dorcadion parnassi Kraatz, 1873
 Dorcadion parcepunctatum Breuning, 1948
 Dorcadion parinfernale Breuning, 1975
 Dorcadion pasquieri Breuning, 1974
 Dorcadion pavesii Pesarini & Sabbadini, 1998
 Dorcadion pedestre (Poda, 1761)
 Dorcadion peksi Bernhauer, 2010
 Dorcadion peloponesium Pic, 1902
 Dorcadion petrovitzi Heyrovský, 1964
 Dorcadion pilosellum Kraatz, 1873
 Dorcadion pilosipenne Breuning, 1943
 Dorcadion piochardi Kraatz, 1873
 Dorcadion pittinorum Pesarini & Sabbadini, 1998
 Dorcadion pluto Thomson, 1867
 Dorcadion poleti Breuning, 1948
 Dorcadion praetermissum Pesarini & Sabbadini, 1998
 Dorcadion preissi Heyden, 1894 
 Dorcadion pseudarcivagum Breuning, 1943
 Dorcadion pseudinfernale Breuning, 1943
 Dorcadion pseudobithyniense Breuning, 1962
 Dorcadion pseudocinctellum Breuning, 1943
 Dorcadion pseudoholosericeum Breuning, 1962
 Dorcadion pseudonobile Breuning, 1946
 Dorcadion pseudopreissi Breuning, 1962
 Dorcadion punctipenne Küster, 1852
 Dorcadion punctulicolle Breuning, 1944
 Dorcadion purkynei Heyrovsky, 1925
 Dorcadion pusillum Küster, 1847
 Dorcadion quadripustulatum Kraatz, 1873
 Dorcadion regulare Pic, 1931
 Dorcadion reitteri Ganglbauer, 1883
 Dorcadion ressli Holzschuh, 2007
 Dorcadion rigattii Breuning, 1966
 Dorcadion rizeanum (Breuning & Villiers, 1967)
 Dorcadion robustum Ganglbauer, 1883
 Dorcadion rolandmenradi Peks, 1992
 Dorcadion rosinae Daniel, 1900
 Dorcadion rufoapicipenne Breuning, 1946
 Dorcadion rufogenum Reitter, 1895
 Dorcadion sareptanum Kraatz, 1873
 Dorcadion saulcyi Thomson, 1865
 Dorcadion scabricolle Dalman, 1817
 Dorcadion schultzei Heyden, 1894
 Dorcadion scopolii (Herbst, 1784)
 Dorcadion scrobicolle Kraatz, 1873
 Dorcadion semenovi Ganglbauer, 1883
 Dorcadion semiargentatum Pic, 1905
 Dorcadion semilineatum Fairmaire, 1866
 Dorcadion semilucens Kraatz, 1873
 Dorcadion seminudum Kraatz, 1873
 Dorcadion semivelutinum Kraatz, 1873
 Dorcadion septemlineatum Waltl, 1838
 Dorcadion sericatum Sahlberg, 1823
 Dorcadion sevliczi Danilevsky, 1985
 Dorcadion shestopalovi Danilevsky, 1993
 Dorcadion shirvanicum Bogatschew, 1934
 Dorcadion shushense Lazarev, 2010
 Dorcadion sinopense Breuning, 1962
 Dorcadion sinuatevittatum Pic, 1937
 Dorcadion sisianense Lazarev, 2009
 Dorcadion skoupyorum Bernhauer & Peks, 2013
 Dorcadion smyrnense (Linnaeus, 1757)
 Dorcadion sodale Hampe, 1852
 Dorcadion sonjae Peks, 1993
 Dorcadion spectabile Kraatz, 1873
 Dorcadion steineri Holzschuh, 1977
 Dorcadion stephaniae Pesarini & Sabbadini, 2003
 Dorcadion striolatum Kraatz, 1873
 Dorcadion sturmii Frivaldsky, 1837
 Dorcadion subcinctellum Breuning, 1962
 Dorcadion subcorpulentum Breuning, 1946
 Dorcadion subinterruptum Pic, 1900
 Dorcadion subsericatum Pic, 1901
 Dorcadion subvestitum K. Daniel, 1901
 Dorcadion sulcipenne Küster, 1847
 Dorcadion syriense Breuning, 1943
 Dorcadion taborskyi Heyrovsky, 1941
 Dorcadion talyshense Ganglbauer, 1883
 Dorcadion tauricum Waltl, 1838

 Dorcadion taygetanum Pic, 1902
 Dorcadion tebrisicum Plavilstshikov, 1951
 Dorcadion theophilei Pic, 1898
 Dorcadion thessalicum Pic, 1916
 Dorcadion tuerki Ganglbauer, 1884
 Dorcadion tuleskovi Heyrovsky, 1937
 Dorcadion turcicum Breuning, 1963
 Dorcadion turkestanicum Kraatz, 1881
 Dorcadion ullrichi Bernhauer, 1988
 Dorcadion urmianum Plavilstshikov, 1937  
 Dorcadion variegatum Ganglbauer, 1884
 Dorcadion veluchense Pic, 1903
 Dorcadion vincenzae Pesarini & Sabbadini, 2007
 Dorcadion wagneri Küster, 1846
 Dorcadion weyersii Fairmaire, 1866
 Dorcadion xerophilum Pesarini & Sabbadini, 2003
 Dorcadion peloponnesicum Breuning, 1982
 Dorcadion valonense Pic, 1917
 Dorcadion vittigerum (Panzer)
 Dorcadion zanteanum Breuning & Villiers, 1967

subgenus Dorcadion 
 Dorcadion abakumovi Thomson, 1864
 Dorcadion alakoliense Danilevsky, 1988
 Dorcadion cephalotes Jakovlev, 1890
 Dorcadion crassipes Ballion, 1878
 Dorcadion ganglbaueri Jakovlev, 1897
 Dorcadion gebleri Kraatz, 1873
 Dorcadion glycyrrhizae (Pallas, 1773)
 Dorcadion tenuelineatum Jakovlev, 1895

subgenus Iberodorcadion 
 Dorcadion abulense Lauffer, 1902

 Dorcadion aguadoi (Aguado & Tomé, 2000)
 Dorcadion albicans Chevrolat, 1862
 Dorcadion almarzense Escalera, 1902
 Dorcadion amorii Marseuil, 1856
 Dorcadion aries (Tomé & Berger, 1999)
 Dorcadion atlantis Bedel, 1921
 Dorcadion becerrae Lauffer, 1901
 Dorcadion bolivari Lauffer, 1898
 Dorcadion brannani Schaufuss, 1870
 Dorcadion castilianum Chevrolat, 1862
 Dorcadion circumcinctum Chevrolat, 1862
 Dorcadion coelloi (Verdugo, 1995)
 Dorcadion ferdinandi Escalera, 1900
 Dorcadion fuentei Pic, 1899
 Dorcadion fuliginator (Linnaeus, 1758)
 Dorcadion graellsii Graells, 1858
 Dorcadion grustani Gonzales, 1992
 Dorcadion heydenii Kraatz, 1870
 Dorcadion isernii Perez-Arcas, 1868
 Dorcadion korbi Ganglbauer, 1883
 Dorcadion lorquinii Fairmaire, 1855
 Dorcadion lusitanicum Chevrolat, 1840
 Dorcadion marmottani Escalera, 1900
 Dorcadion martinezii Perez-Arcas, 1874
 Dorcadion mimomucidum Breuning, 1976
 Dorcadion molitor (Fabricius, 1775)
 Dorcadion mosqueruelense Escalera, 1902
 Dorcadion mucidum Dalman, 1817
 Dorcadion mus Rosenhauer, 1856
 Dorcadion neilense Escalera, 1902
 Dorcadion nigrosparsum Pic, 1941
 Dorcadion paulae Corraleño Iñarra & Murría Beltrán, 2012
 Dorcadion perezi Graells, 1849
 Dorcadion pseudomolitor Escalera, 1902
 Dorcadion segovianum Chevrolat, 1862
 Dorcadion seguntianum K. Daniel & J. Daniel, 1899
 Dorcadion seoanei Graells, 1858
 Dorcadion spinolae Dalman, 1817
 Dorcadion suturale Chevrolat, 1862
 Dorcadion terolense Escalera, 1902
 Dorcadion uhagonii Perez-Arcas, 1868
 Dorcadion zarcoi Schramm, 1910
 Dorcadion zenete (Anichtchenko & Verdugo, 2004)

subgenus Maculatodorcadion 
 Dorcadion quadrimaculatum Küster, 1848
 Dorcadion triste Frivaldszky, 1845
 Dorcadion wolfi Krätschmer, 1985

subgenus Megalodorcadion 
 Dorcadion escherichi Ganglbauer, 1897
 Dorcadion glabrofasciatum K. Daniel, 1901
 Dorcadion ledereri Thomson, 1865
 Dorcadion parallelum Küster, 1847
 Dorcadion walteri Holzschuh, 1991

subgenus Politodorcadion 
 Dorcadion archalense (Danilevsky, 1996)
 Dorcadion balchashense Suvorov, 1911
 Dorcadion eurygyne Suvorov, 1911
 Dorcadion lativittis Kraatz, 1878
 Dorcadion politum Dalman, 1823
 Dorcadion ribbei Kraatz, 1878

References

Cerambycidae genera
Dorcadiini